Fo Pang is an area located in a valley of Kowloon, Hong Kong.  It is at the northeast of Danger Flag Hill and south of Ho Man Tin proper.  It is about present-day Wylie Road and east of Wah Yan College, Kowloon.

History
At the time of the 1911 census, the population of Fo Pang was 180. The number of males was 126.

Before the construction of the college, the No. 1 Kowloon Cemetery for Europeans was located in the area and closed on 15December 1933.

Transportation
The Kowloon-Canton Railway passes through the area.

References

Yau Ma Tei
Ho Man Tin
Wah Yan